The Ocicat is an all-domestic breed of cat which resembles a wild cat but has no recent wild DNA in its gene pool. The breed is unusual in that it is spotted like a wild cat but has the temperament of a domestic animal. It is named for its resemblance to the ocelot. The breed was established from the Siamese and Abyssinian. American Shorthair was also added to the original crosses due to an error in the Cat Fanciers' Association, Inc's recording of the breeds used. This mix of breeds created a healthy, large breed of cat completely different in type and appearance from the source breeds.

History
The first breeder of Ocicats was Virginia Daly, of Berkley, Michigan, who attempted to breed an Abyssinian-pointed Siamese in 1964. The first generation of kittens appeared Abyssinian, but the result in the second generation was not only the Abyssinian-pointed Siamese but also a spotted kitten, Tonga, nicknamed an "ocicat" by the breeder's daughter. Tonga was neutered and sold as a pet, but further breedings of his parents produced more spotted kittens, and became the basis of a separate Ocicat breeding program. Other breeders joined in and used the same recipe, Siamese to Abyssinian, and offspring to Siamese. In addition, due to an error by CFA in recording the cross that produced the Ocicat, the American Shorthair was introduced to the Ocicat giving the breed larger boning and adding silver to the 6 colors. The Ocicat was initially accepted for registration in The Cat Fanciers' Association, Inc., and was moved into Championship for showing in 1987. Other registries followed. Today the Ocicat is found all around the world, popular for its all-domestic temperament but wild appearance.  The Ocicat was named by Virginia's daughter, Virginia E. Daly.

Physical characteristics
The ideal Ocicat has almond shaped eyes, a large, strong body, muscular legs, and powerful, oval shaped paws. The head is a wedge shape, that is, longer than wide. Their ears are tilted at a 45 degree angle. One of the most striking things about this breed is the large, thumbprint-shaped contrasting spots.  The breed's large, well-muscled body gives an impression of power and strength. Females weigh from 6 to 9 pounds on average, and males from 9 to 15.

Twelve variations in color are approved by most registries, including The Cat Fanciers' Association, Inc. The standard for the Ocicat breed is tawny (genetic black), chocolate and cinnamon, their dilutes, blue, lavender and fawn, black silver (or ebony silver), chocolate silver, cinnamon silver, blue silver, lavender silver and fawn silver.

Temperament
Ocicats have inherited personality traits from both Siamese and Abyssinians, two breeds considered to be domesticated for many thousands of years. They will often greet your guests, and are friendly and sociable. They are ideal pets for most households, generally tolerating gentle children and other pets. 

Their temperament is often described as that of a "dog in a cat's body". Most can be trained to fetch, walk on a leash and harness, come when called, speak, sit, lie down on command and other canine-style tricks. Some even take readily to water. Most are especially agile and are motivated by play with toys. Given these attributes, the Ocicat requires more attention from its owners than most breeds. They do get along well with other animals and people, however, and appreciate an animal companion to keep them company if left alone for any length of time. The uniqueness of this breed lies in the fact that they can behave like the original ocelot. Ocicats show habits of wild cats such as hunting (but not in distant places, since the ocicats are unlikely to go far from home if the largest fence is installed next to the house area), spying so that nothing happens to the kittens, and recognizing small outlandish animals as prey. But they are not devoid of domestic habits.

Types

References

External links

Federation Feline international Breed Profile: Ocicat
Cat Fanciers' Association Breed Profile: Ocicat
Jim DeBruhl, Sonja Moscoffian, and Shana Otis-Kuhnert, The Ocicat; CFA Yearbook, 1996 
CFA Ocicat Breed Council

Cat breeds
Cat breeds originating in the United States